Jarvis Bay Provincial Park  is a provincial park in Alberta, Canada, located  north from Sylvan Lake and  west from Red Deer, along Highway 20.

It was established on July 8, 1965 and is maintained by Alberta Tourism, Parks and Recreation.

See also
List of provincial parks in Alberta
List of Canadian provincial parks
List of National Parks of Canada

External links

Lacombe County
Provincial parks of Alberta